Churfürsten is a mountain range in the Canton of St. Gallen, Switzerland.  They form the natural boundary between the canton's Toggenburg and Sarganserland districts.
They are the southernmost range of the Appenzell Alps, separated from the Glarus Alps by the Seez river and Walensee.
They consist of a limestone ridge running east to west, with the individual peaks formed by erosion.
The ridge is defined much more sharply to the south than to the north, with an almost vertical drop of several hundred meters towards Walenstadtberg and eventually Lake Walensee at 419 m. The southern slope of the range was significantly formed by the Rhine Glacier during the Würm glaciation.

The name is a plural, indicating the peaks forming the historical boundary of the bishopric of Chur.
It has historically also been folk-etymologized as Kurfürsten, i.e. the 7 prince-electors of the Holy Roman Empire who in the later medieval period (until 1648) numbered seven, which in turn encouraged the count of seven main or "official" peaks.

The standard "seven peaks" of the Churfürsten are (from west to east):
Selun (2205 m)
Frümsel (2263 m)
Brisi (2279 m)
Zuestoll (2235 m)
Schibenstoll (2234 m)
Hinterrugg (2306 m)
Chäserrugg (2262 m)
The count of exactly seven peaks is contrived; sometimes, Chäserrugg is not included and counted as part of Hinterrugg, because of its topographical prominence of a mere 14 m.

The Churfürsten seven peaks listed above have remarkably uniform heights (within just above a 100 m difference); the ridge continues both to the east and the west with a number of further peaks between 2000 and 2200 m that are not usually included as Churfürsten:
Peaks to the west of Selun:  Wart (2068 m), Schären (or Schäären, 2184 m), Nägeliberg (2153 m), Glattchamm (2084 m), Leistchamm (2101 m).
Peaks to the east of Chäserrugg: Tristenkolben (2159 m), Gamserrugg (2076 m).

References 

Mountains of the Alps
Mountains of Switzerland
Mountains of the canton of St. Gallen
Toggenburg